Junior Warrant Officer Deepak Kumar (born 5 November 1987) is an Indian sport shooter and a Junior Commissioned officer (JCO) in the Indian Air Force. He won a bronze medal at the 2018 ISSF World Cup in Guadalajara in the 10 metre air rifle mixed team event with Mehuli Ghosh.

He represented India at the 2020 Summer Olympics.

References

External links
 
 
 
 

Living people
1987 births
Indian male sport shooters
Sport shooters from Delhi
Shooters at the 2018 Commonwealth Games
Shooters at the 2018 Asian Games
Medalists at the 2018 Asian Games
Asian Games silver medalists for India
Asian Games medalists in shooting
Commonwealth Games competitors for India
Shooters at the 2020 Summer Olympics
Olympic shooters of India